The 1912 Richmond Spiders football team was an American football team that represented Richmond College—now known as the University of Richmond—as a member of the Eastern Virginia Intercollegiate Athletic Association (EVIAA) during the 1912 college football season. Led by E. A. Dunlap in his sixth and final year as head coach, Richmond Richmond compiled an overall record of 1–7 with a mark of 1–2 in conference play, placing third in the EVIAA.

Schedule

References

Richmond
Richmond Spiders football seasons
Richmond Spiders football